Causeway Bay North or Victoria Park is a proposed station of the MTR rapid transit network in Hong Kong, which would be situated at the northern part of Causeway Bay to the northwest of Victoria Park on Hong Kong Island.

However, a major drawback was that road traffic would be severely impacted, as this would involve closing Gloucester Road for 5 years. Eventually, this station was eliminated from the SCL plan altogether after the MTR–KCR merger, and will only be part of the NIL if it is constructed.

In 2013, the name "Causeway Bay North" was mentioned in the Review and Update of the Railway Development Strategy 2000 as an intermediate station on the North Island line, instead of "Victoria Park".

See also
North Island line

References
This article draws some information from the corresponding article in Chinese Wikipedia.

External links
Victoria Park interchange station

MTR stations on Hong Kong Island
Proposed railway stations in Hong Kong
Causeway Bay